The 1992–93 Ronchetti Cup was the 22nd edition of FIBA Europe's second competition for women's basketball teams, running from 30 September 1992 to 17 March 1993. Basket Parma defeated Olimpia Poznan in the final to win its second title three years later. The competition's qualifying stage was expanded due to the break-up of the Soviet Union and the SFR Yugoslavia, while the three teams from the FR Yugoslavia were disqualified in application of the United Nations Security Council Resolution 757.

Qualifying round

Round of 32

Group stage

Group A

Group B

Group C

Group D

Quarter-finals

Semifinals

Final

References

1992-93
1992–93 in European women's basketball